Emperor Shun (fl. 2233 BC - 2184 BC) was a legendary leader of ancient China.

Emperor Shun, Shundi, or Shun Di may also refer to:
Emperor Shun of Han (115–144), emperor of the Han dynasty
Emperor Shun of Liu Song (467–479), emperor of the Liu Song dynasty
Toghon Temür (1320–1370), emperor of the Yuan dynasty
Li Zicheng (1606–1645), the only emperor of Shun
Shundi (fictional kingdom), a fictional kingdom in Goopy Gyne Bagha Byne
Shun Di, a character from Virtua Fighter